Cefteram (INN) is a third-generation cephalosporin antibiotic.

References 

Cephalosporin antibiotics
Thiazoles
Tetrazoles
Ketoximes